Vladimir Ivanovich Romanov (5 December 1950 – 12 October 2006), known as The Kaliningrad Maniac, was a Soviet-Russian serial killer, rapist and pedophile. Between 1991 and 2005, he committed at least 12 murders associated with rape.

Biography
Romanov lived in the town of Bagrationovsk. In 1991, he committed the double murder of teenage girls whose bodies he later buried. Due to the absence of the corpses, the victims were considered missing and the case remained unsolved. During the same year, he raped a 12-year-old girl and tried to strangle her. The victim remained alive and gave a description of the offender, with Romanov being arrested soon after and sentenced to 10 years in prison. While in prison, he was raped by another inmate. After his release in 2001, Romanov began working as a driver for hire.

In order not to go to prison again, Romanov carefully planned his crimes. His victims were young girls and women between 12 and 19 years, whom he always raped and then killed, either burying the bodies in the forest or sometimes burning them.

On 25 September 2006, he attempted to rape a 24-year-old who managed to escape and remember his car's registration number. Two days later, Romanov was arrested. He immediately confessed to killing a number of girls between 2001 and 2005, a total of 10 murders being established. He also confessed to the 1991 double murder.

Victims 

Romanov described in detail some of the killings. Here are some of his descriptions:

Death 
Romanov was placed in Kaliningrad's pre-trial detention center No. 1, and was immediately put in solitary confinement. On 11 October 2006, he confessed to committing a thirteenth murder, the circumstances of which he planned to tell later. However, on the night of 12 October, the 56-year-old pedophile hanged himself with his bed sheets, leaving a brief suicide note addressed to his son, in which he apologized to his family.

The investigators suspected that Romanov could be responsible for up to 20 murders.

In the media 
 "Hunting for Maniacs" - "Channel First" (2008).

See also
 List of Russian serial killers
 List of serial killers by number of victims

References

External links 
 Domestic serial killers of different years (late 20th - early 21st centuries). Part 1. Mysterious crimes of the past. Accessed on 5 April 2013.

1950 births
2006 deaths
2006 suicides
Male serial killers
Russian murderers of children
Russian people convicted of child sexual abuse
Russian rapists
Russian serial killers
Serial killers who committed suicide in prison custody
Soviet murderers of children
Soviet people convicted of child sexual abuse
Soviet rapists
Soviet serial killers
Suicides by hanging in Russia